This was the first edition of the tournament.

Laurynas Grigelis and Andrea Pellegrino won the title after defeating Ariel Behar and Gonzalo Escobar 1–6, 6–3, [10–7] in the final.

Seeds

Draw

References

External links
 Main draw

Internazionali di Tennis Emilia Romagna - Doubles